The Metro Manila Film Festival Award for Best Picture is an award presented annually by the Metropolitan Manila Development Authority (MMDA). It was first awarded at the 1st Metro Manila Film Festival ceremony, held in 1975; the film Diligin Mo ng Hamog ang Uhaw na Lupa starring Joseph Estrada received the award and it is given in honor of the film that 
has delivered an outstanding creation of the film, including directing, acting, music composing, writing, editing and other efforts put forth into a film. The category was first named "Best Film" before changing it to "Best Picture" in 2007. Currently, nominees and winners are determined by Executive Committees, headed by the Metropolitan Manila Development Authority Chairman and key members of the film industry.

Winners and nominees

1970s

1980s

1990s

2000s

2010s

2020s

Notes

References

External links
IMDB: Metro Manila Film Festival
Official website of the Metro Manila Film Festival

Picture
Awards for best film